Bronson Park Historic District is a historic district in Kalamazoo, Michigan, consisting of Bronson Park and the surrounding government, religious, and civic buildings. It is roughly bounded by South Rose, South Park, West Lovell, and West Michigan Avenues. The district was listed on the National Register of Historic Places in 1983.

History
The area around Bronson Park was platted by Kalamazoo's founder, Titus Bronson, in 1831. Bronson Park itself, then divided in two by Church Street, was donated by Bronson to the city, with the indication that half was to be used as a "jail square" and the other half as an "academy square." The squares directly to the north were designated as "church square" and "courthouse square." For some time, the four squares served their intended purpose, as churches were constructed, Kalamazoo became the county seat, Kalamazoo's first jail was built on jail square, and a branch of the University of Michigan was opened on academy square. However, within a couple of decades, the jail and academy were moved and Church Street was vacated to join the two squares. For many years, what is now Bronson Park remained unimproved cow pasture.

In 1876, the previously unnamed land was renamed "Bronson Park," and the area was landscaped, with a fountain placed in the park center. As Kalamazoo grew, the park and the neighboring courthouse and church squares remained the civic heart of the city. The first courthouse, constructed in 1837, was built on courthouse square, as were subsequent 1885 and 1935-37 buildings. Churches constructed in the district include the First Methodist church (dating from 1833), the First Congregational (1835), First Baptist (1836), St. Luke's Episcopal (1837), First Presbyterian (1849), First Reformed (1850), and the First Church of Christ, Scientist. The district also includes the Ladies Library Association Building, built in 1878, the YWCA Building, the 1931 Kalamazoo City Hall  and the 1938 Federal Building.

Description
Bronson Park Historic District contains Bronson Park itself, the city's public square, as well as seventeen surrounding structures. These structures are some of Kalamazoo's oldest and most architecturally significant governmental, civic, and religious structures. These include the following:

302 Academy Street - First Reformed Church
431 Academy Street - Harry B. Hoyt House
226 W. Lovell Street - Austin-Sill House
247 W. Lovell Street - St. Luke's Episcopal Church 
227 W. Michigan Avenue - Kalamazoo County Building
315 W. Michigan Avenue - First Baptist Church 
410 W. Michigan Avenue - Federal Building
129 S. Park Street - First Congregational Church
212 S. Perk Street - United Methodist Church
329 S. Park Street - Civic Auditorium
333 S. Perk Street - Ladies Library Assoc. Building
219 W. South Street - Lawrence House/Park Club
241 W. South Street - City Hall
321 W. South Street - First Presbyterian Church
414 W. South Street - First Church of Christ, Scientist
211 S. Rose Street - Y.W.C.A. Building
340 S. Rose Street - Prange Building

Gallery

References

		
National Register of Historic Places in Kalamazoo County, Michigan
Art Deco architecture in Michigan